Duncan Macmillan (February 11, 1837 – April 21, 1903) was a Canadian lawyer, judge and political figure in Ontario, Canada. He represented Middlesex East in the House of Commons of Canada from 1875 to 1887 as a Liberal-Conservative member.

He was born in London Township, Upper Canada, the son of William Macmillan, and was educated at Queen's University. Macmillan studied law with Sir John A. Macdonald and was called to the bar in 1861. He practised law in London, Ontario. He was elected to the House of Commons in an 1875 by-election held after Crowell Willson was unseated. In 1873, he was named a judge in the court for Haldimand County. Macmillan died at the age of 66 in London, Ontario while still a judge.

References 

1837 births
1903 deaths
Members of the House of Commons of Canada from Ontario
Conservative Party of Canada (1867–1942) MPs
Judges in Ontario